Matthias Iberer (born April 29, 1985) is an Austrian former professional ice hockey player who ended his career playing for EHC Black Wings Linz of the Austrian Hockey League (EBEL). He has formerly played with fellow Austrian club, Graz 99ers of the EBEL

Having suffered a broken back in November 2014, Iberer returned to play out the 2014–15 season before ending his professional career on April 2, 2015.

Iberer competed in the 2013 IIHF World Championship as a member of the Austria men's national ice hockey team, he finished with 35 National team appearances.

Career statistics

Regular season and playoffs

International

References

External links

1985 births
Living people
Austrian ice hockey right wingers
EHC Black Wings Linz players
Graz 99ers players
Ice hockey players at the 2014 Winter Olympics
Kalamazoo Wings (2007–2009) players
Olympic ice hockey players of Austria
Sportspeople from Graz